Nugurun Falls is a small waterfall on West Canungra Creek, a tributary of the Logan River, in Queensland, Australia. The waterfall is located within the Green Mountains section of Lamington National Park, in the Scenic Rim Region, near the resort village of O'reillys. Like other waterfalls in the area, Nugurun Falls is surrounded by dense rainforest.

Namesake
The word 'Nugurun' is believed to be an Aboriginal word from the Bundjalung language, meaning 'dingo'.

Access
The falls are accessible by the 10.9 km metre maintained Box Forest Circuit walking track from O'Reilly's, the track is unsuitable for wheelchairs and bicycles and is a medium-steep level on foot. There are many more waterfalls along the circuit.

See also

List of waterfalls of Australia

References

Waterfalls in Lamington National Park
Scenic Rim Region
Logan River